Sebaste, officially the Municipality of Sebaste,  is a 4th class municipality in the province of Antique, Philippines. According to the 2020 census, it has a population of 18,816 people.
Making it 16th most populous municipality in the province of Antique.

Sebaste has 1 private high school (Saint Blaise High School) and 1 public high school (Sebaste High School/Sebaste National High School). Every February 3, people celebrate the annual feast of their patron saint.

Geography

According to the Philippine Statistics Authority, the municipality has a land area of  constituting  of the  total area of Antique.

Climate

Barangays
Sebaste is politically subdivided into 10 barangays.

Demographics

In the 2020 census, Sebaste had a population of 18,816.

Kinaray-a is the dominant language of Sebaste while Hiligaynon is used as a secondary language.

Economy

References

External links
 [ Philippine Standard Geographic Code]

Municipalities of Antique (province)